Luuk van Bree (born 24 February 1996) is a Dutch basketball player for ZZ Leiden. He played collegiate basketball for Bradley. Van Bree also played for the Netherlands national team.

College career
As a freshman at Bradley, van Bree averaged 8.4 points and 4.6 rebounds per game. He was named to the Missouri Valley Conference All-Freshman Team. He averaged 6.5 points and 3.3 rebounds per game as a sophomore, leading the team with 26 steals. van Bree posted 4.8 points and 2.4 rebounds per game as a junior. As a senior, van Bree averaged 5.7 points and 4.0 rebounds per game.

Professional career
On 25 June 2020, van Bree signed a 2-year contract with ZZ Leiden of the Dutch Basketball League (DBL).

National team career

Van Bree made his debut with the Netherlands men's national basketball team on 22 February 2021 in a game against Sweden under coach Maurizio Buscaglia.

References

External links
ESPN profile
Bradley Braves bio

1996 births
Living people
Bradley Braves men's basketball players
B.S. Leiden players
Dutch Basketball League players
Dutch expatriate basketball people in the United States
Dutch men's basketball players
Sportspeople from Helmond
Power forwards (basketball)
ZZ Leiden players